The 1964 National Challenge Cup was the 51st edition of the USSFA's annual open soccer championship.

Final

References 
 

Lamar Hunt U.S. Open Cup
U.S. Open Cup
National Challenge Cup
National Challenge Cup